The following Union Army units and commanders fought in the Battle of Five Forks of the American Civil War. The Confederate order of battle is listed separately.

Abbreviations used

Military rank
 MG = Major General
 BG = Brigadier General
 Col = Colonel
 Ltc = Lieutenant Colonel
 Maj = Major
 Cpt = Captain
 Lt = 1st Lieutenant
 Bvt = Brevet

Other
 w = wounded
 mw = mortally wounded
 k = killed

Army of the Shenandoah

MG Philip Sheridan, Commanding

V Corps

MG Gouverneur K. Warren [relieved]
Bvt MG Charles Griffin

Cavalry Corps

Bvt MG Wesley Merritt

See also

 Virginia in the American Civil War

Notes

References
 Eicher, John H., and Eicher, David J., Civil War High Commands, Stanford University Press, 2001, .
 U.S. War Department, The War of the Rebellion: A Compilation of the Official Records of the Union and Confederate Armies, (Washington, DC:  U.S. Government Printing Office), 1886.

American Civil War orders of battle